Fu Meng-po (born May 13, 1987) is a Taiwanese actor. He is best known for his roles in the romance films Your Love Song (2020) and I Missed You (2021), as well as the period series The Sleuth of the Ming Dynasty (2020). He has also appeared in the drama film Father to Son (2018) and in the horror film Detention (2019), with the former scoring him a Best New Performer nomination at the 55th Golden Horse Awards.

Filmography

Television series

Film

Variety and reality show

Music video appearances

Discography

Singles

Awards and nominations

References

External links 

 
 
 
 

1987 births
Living people
Taiwanese male television actors
Taiwanese male film actors
21st-century Taiwanese male actors
Taipei National University of the Arts alumni